Lazarus You Heung-sik (or Lazzaro; ; born 17 November 1951) is a South Korean prelate of the Catholic Church who has served as Prefect of the Dicastery for the Clergy since 2021. He is the first Korean to head a department of the Roman Curia. He previously served as Bishop of Daejeon from 2005 to 2021, after two years as a coadjutor bishop under Bishop Joseph Kyeong Kap-ryong. You was created a cardinal by Pope Francis in 2022.

Biography
Lazarus You Heung-sik was born on 17 November 1951 in Nonsan, South Chungcheong, South Korea. He was baptized a Catholic at the age of sixteen. He studied first in Seoul at the Catholic University of Korea and then in Rome, where he earned a degree in dogmatic theology at the Pontifical Lateran University. He was ordained a priest on 9 December 1979.

His assignments included stints as an assistant priest at the diocesan cathedral, director of a retreat house, and director of an education center. Beginning in 1994, he worked as a spiritual director and professor at the Catholic University of Daejeon; he became its president from 1998 to 2003. He has been associated with the Focolare Movement and attended international gatherings of bishops who promote it.

On 9 July 2003, Pope John Paul II named him Bishop Coadjutor of the Diocese of Daejeon. He received his episcopal consecration on 19 August 2003 from Bishop Joseph Kyeong Kap-ryong of Daejeon. He became bishop upon the retirement of Kyeong on 1 April 2005.

On 29 May 2007, Pope Benedict XVI named him a member of the Pontifical Council Cor Unum.

While bishop of Daejeon he has led several of the Catholic Bishops' Conference of Korea's committees, including those on migrants, youth ministry, and the promotion of the cause of Korean martyrs. While serving as head of Caritas Korea from 2004 to 2008, You visited Pyongyang four times.

In 2014, his diocese hosted Pope Francis, who celebrated Mass in Daejeon World Cup Stadium, participated in Asian Youth Day, and met with Asian bishops. He participated in the 2018 Synod of Bishops on Youth and Discernment by papal appointment. He described the situation of young people in Korea: "Since childhood they grow up in a highly competitive society. Competition thwarts fraternal relations, it casts off friendships and nurtures loneliness." He took advantage of the synod to meet the two participating bishops from China. He expressed hope for peace on the Korean peninsula; he imagined an eventual papal visit to North Korea, but warned that it would require extensive preparations, "starting with the issue of religious freedom and the presence of priests". On 14 October 2020 he became secretary of the Korean Bishops Conference.

On 11 June 2021, Pope Francis appointed him to succeed Cardinal Beniamino Stella as prefect of the Congregation for the Clergy, with the date on which he takes office left unspecified. He was given the personal title of archbishop along with that of bishop emeritus of Daejeon. You subsequently moved to Rome and assumed his new post as the prefect on 2 August.

In February 2022, he participated in the San Damaso Ecclesiastical University of Madrid, Spain, with a conference in the fifth edition of the pastoral update sessions for priests.

On 29 May 2022, Pope Francis announced that he would elevate You to the rank of cardinal. On 27 August, Pope Francis made him a cardinal deacon, assigning him the deaconry Gesù Buon Pastore alla Montagnola.

On 13 July 2022, Pope Francis named him a member of the Dicastery for Bishops.

See also
 Cardinals created by Pope Francis

Notes

References

External links

 
 
  

1951 births
Living people
People from Nonsan
Pontifical Lateran University alumni
Bishops appointed by Pope John Paul II
21st-century Roman Catholic bishops in South Korea
South Korean Roman Catholic archbishops
Prefects of the Congregation for the Clergy
South Korean cardinals
Cardinals created by Pope Francis